James Fraser Maxwell (26 June 1900 – 1964) was a Scottish footballer who played in the Football League for Stoke City and Watford.

Career
Maxwell was born in Glasgow and played for Neliston Victoria and Arbroath before joining Stoke City in 1925. He played ten matches for Stoke in the 1925–26 season at Outside left and was released at the end of the season. He joined Watford where he played four times scoring once.

Career statistics
Source:

References

Scottish footballers
Stoke City F.C. players
Watford F.C. players
English Football League players
1900 births
1964 deaths
Arbroath F.C. players
Footballers from Glasgow
Association football wingers